Let Us Pray is the debut album by the American death metal band Vital Remains. It was released by Deaf Records/Peaceville Records in 1992. It is the only album to feature Ace Alonzo on drums.

Track listing
All songs written and arranged by Vital Remains.

Personnel
Jeff Gruslin - vocals
Tony Lazaro - rhythm guitar
Paul Flynn - lead guitar
Joseph "Joe" Lewis - bass
Ace Alonzo - drums

References

1991 debut albums
Vital Remains albums
Peaceville Records albums